Selçuk İnan (born 10 February 1985) is a Turkish football coach and former professional footballer who most recently managed Süper Lig side Kasımpaşa.

Early life
İnan was born in Iskenderun on 10 February 1985. By the age of 14, he was spotted by scouting agents and immediately signed by one of the local clubs, Karaağaçspor. His multidimensional style of play and unique footballing mind were soon to be discovered by Dardanel Spor. At professional level, İnan scored his first goal in a league game against Antalyaspor on 1 December 2002, when he was only 17.

Club career
İnan began his career as a 14-year-old for Karaağaçspor. He signed for Dardanel Spor in 2000, when he played until his departure to Manisaspor in 2005. Trabzonspor signed İnan in 2008, where he played for three seasons.

Trabzonspor
Trabzonspor, then coached by Ersun Yanal (İnan's former trainer at Manisaspor), signed İnan in early 2008. He scored two goals against Ankaraspor in his first Süper Lig game at Trabzonspor, then also scored Trabzonspor's 2,000th league goal in a game against İstanbul BB on 1 November 2008. He had formed a prolific partnership with strikers Umut Bulut and Burak Yılmaz, the latter a former teammate of İnan at Manisaspor). During İnan's services, Trabzonspor had its most successful two seasons of the decade, most notably finishing champions in the 2010–11 Süper Lig season.

Galatasaray
İnan agreed to a five-year deal on a free transfer with Galatasaray on 25 May 2011. He quickly took over the Galatasaray midfield from the day he set foot in Türk Telekom Arena. Partnering up with Brazilian midfielder Felipe Melo, İnan began to manifest his exceptional skills which helped Galatasaray to gain a higher level of offensive and defensive state of play. İnan, being a fan favourite at Galatasaray, received the a nickname called "Xelçuk", a play on words after Spanish midfielder Xavi.

2011–12 season
In the 2010–11 Süper Lig season, Galatasaray finished eighth in the league table with 14 wins, 4 draws and 16 losses, its worst season in the club's history of 107 years. Right after the last game of the season, the club announced a council meeting in order to elect a new board of directors.

During his first month, the fledgling Galatasaray chairman Ünal Aysal's first task was to bring in İnan to the team. Although the previous Galatasaray board which was run by Adnan Polat already had an agreement with Trabzonspor in the Selçuk İnan case during the 2010–11 season, it was the new board that brought in the player for free as İnan's contract with Trabzonspor was over.

After the first four games of the new season, Galatasaray had two wins, one draw and one loss, which did not seem highly promising to the fans, although there was a remarkable sense of change in the team, especially in the midfield area.

İnan started to lead the team as weeks went by, helping Galatasaray win ten matches in a row and finish the first half of the season with 37 points, top of the league. By the end of matchday 34, right before the Süper Final series, Galatasaray was both the highest-scoring and least conceding team in the league, and had a nine-point gap with their closest competitors, Fenerbahçe.

İnan scored his first official goal for Galatasaray against Samsunspor on 18 September 2011. His first free-kick goal came against his former club Trabzonspor on 11 December. The game resulted in a 3–0 win for Galatasaray. He scored his second free-kick goal against Manisaspor on 21 December, was also the winner for Gala, as the game finished 1–0. His third free-kick goal came against Gençlerbirliği on 10 March 2012, a 2–0 win for Galatasaray. On 28 April, İnan scored his fourth free-kick goal of the season, being the second one against his former club Trabzonspor, followed by his fifth-free kick goal against Fenerbahçe in the Süper Final series. In his first season at Galatasaray, İnan scored a total of 13 goals and made 16 assists in both Süper Lig and Süper Final matches.

During the championship celebrations, held at the Türk Telekom Arena on 13 May, İnan was called onstage twice by Galatasaray fans.

2012–13 season
On 12 August 2012, defending Süper Lig champions Galatasaray beat the defending Turkish Cup winners Fenerbahçe in the 2012 Turkish Super Cup. İnan provided two assists to his teammate Umut Bulut and scored the winning goal himself from a penalty kick in the 90th minute right before the final whistle; the game finished 3–2. As Galatasaray won the Turkish Super Cup for the 12th time, Bulut was voted as the man of the match, although İnan also made a significant contribution to the victory.

İnan scored his first goal of the 2012–13 Süper Lig season – another late penalty – in the game against Beşiktaş on 26 August, the equalizer for Galatasaray as the game finished 3–3. İnan also had one assist in the game which was scored by Umut Bulut as İnan delivered in the corner kick from the left hand side. İnan scored his second goal of the season against İstanbul BB, which was assisted by striker Burak Yılmaz.

On 23 September, İnan started the game against Akhisar Belediyespor wearing the captain's armband, due to vice captain Hakan Balta's absence. The match resulted in a 3–0 win for Galatasaray. After a few disappointing performances both in Süper Lig and the UEFA Champions League during October, İnan responded with a wonderful display against Kayserispor in the Süper Lig match on 27 October, creating two assists to his teammates Burak Yılmaz and Cris, with Cris' header goal coming from the set piece free-kick which was taken by İnan by the left hand side.

İnan scored the free-kick distanced 30 yards, which was the winner goal in the last Kıtalar Arası Derbi of 2012 which secured a five-point gap in the league table as the game finished 2–1 for the Lions.

At the end of the first half of the 2012–13 Süper Lig season, the midfielder had scored four goals and made seven assists in total. İnan also made his mark on the 2012–13 UEFA Champions League scene, securing fifth-place in the group stage top passers list by UEFA. İnan had been second on the list after Barcelona's Xavi as late as matchday 5.

The vice-captain was appointed as the first captain on 25 December.

İnan scored the fourth goal for Galatasaray in the game against Orduspor on 25 February 2013, as he received a ball from Burak Yılmaz right in front of the box. His curved shot from 30 yards out resulted in a spectacular goal which was also the decider as the game finished 4–2.

At the end of Galatasaray's 2012–13 Champions League campaign, where the Turkish outfit were eliminated by Real Madrid in the quarter-finals despite a 3–2 home win, İnan had made five assists in total and was again at second spot after Xavi in UEFA's top passers list. İnan also had 92% pass accuracy in the second leg of the tie against Real Madrid, where he produced 87 passes, which had been a Champions League record for the season.

İnan scored two superlative goals in the Süper Lig game against Sivasspor on 5 May, where Galatasaray claimed their 19th league title. Being nothing more or less than an İnan classic, the beautiful free-kick goal eight minutes into the game, which also received an applause from Sivasspor manager Rıza Çalımbay, put the Lions up 1–0, followed by his second and the team's third goal, a majestic dribble which was crowned with a slick finish, after catching Emmanuel Eboué's through-ball in the 60th minute. As Galatasaray won the game, İnan was chosen as man of the match.

International career

İnan has played at every level for Turkey from under-16 to the senior side. He made his debut against Moldova on 13 October 2007.

Although he was called up back in February for the UEFA Euro 2008 qualifiers match against Georgia, İnan could not join the team on the pitch due to injury. He also did not take action at the Euro 2008 group stage due to a two-game suspension received prior to the tournament.

İnan played at every game in UEFA Euro 2012 qualifiers and made six assists to his teammates in total, although it was not enough for the Turks to qualify for the tournament's final stages, in Poland and Ukraine.

İnan scored his first international goal on 24 May 2012 in a 3–1 friendly match victory over Georgia. His second goal came against Estonia in a 2014 FIFA World Cup qualifying match played on 11 September 2012. He scored his third goal with a finely-curled free-kick over the wall against Andorra in another World Cup qualifier on 22 March 2013.

Inan, a free-kick specialist, scored his most famous goal with the national team against Iceland in UEFA Euro 2016 qualifying Group A. Turkey, going into 89th minute with ten men and a score of 0-0 against an already qualified Iceland, had the chance to be the best third team if the match is won. Inan scored a spectacular free-kick from 30 yards out through the right side of Ögmundur Kristinsson, sending Turkey directly to EURO 2016, without playing the play-offs.

Controversy with Turkey manager Avcı
During Turkey's 2014 World Cup qualifying campaign, Turkey manager Abdullah Avcı insisted on not playing İnan despite his great run of form with Galatasaray. Many Turkish fans refused to believe it was a tactical issue but was rather a case that had been played out off the pitch.

After a multiple games without İnan, Turkish fans began blaming the manager due to the unsuccessful results in qualifying. In a qualifier against Estonia, however, Avcı made a substitution in the 65th minute and İnan finally had his chance after a long period of dissension. The midfielder scored immediately and secured the win for Turkey. İnan, however, did not celebrate his goal and had a quiet statement after the game, as if like he was under pressure or did not have the liberty to talk.

As time progressed, Turkey failed to qualify for the 2014 World Cup, and uncertainties regarding İnan and Avcı were still a hot and live issue in the country. Journalist Fatih Altaylı claimed that he had witnessed certain information suggesting there had been a religious or a sectarian conflict between İnan and the manager, the reason why the two never got along. There have been no statements about the matter from either side.

Personal life
İnan often remains private and is not often seen in the media. He has two elder sisters and lives as a single person residing in Florya, Istanbul, near Galatasaray's main training facility, the Florya Metin Oktay Sports Complex and Training Center. İnan and former Galatasaray teammate Burak Yılmaz are close friends and have played together in four different club and national team set-ups, beginning with the Turkey U17 team. They also grew up knowing one another. Other clubs the two have played together on are Manisaspor, Trabzonspor and lastly Galatasaray.

Career statistics
.

Club

International

International goals
Scores and results table list Turkey's goal tally first:

Managerial

Honours

Club
Trabzonspor
Turkish Cup (1): 2009–10
Turkish Super Cup (1): 2010

Galatasaray
Süper Lig (5): 2011–12, 2012–13, 2014–15, 2017–18, 2018–19
Türkiye Kupası (4): 2013–14, 2014–15, 2015–16, 2018–19
Süper Kupa (5): 2012, 2013, 2015, 2016, 2019

Individual
Süper Lig Top Assister 2011–12 (16)
 Süper Lig Midfielder of the Year 2011–12
 Süper Lig Player of the Year 2011–12, by UEFA
2016 Goal of the Year voted by UEFA. Free kick against Iceland

References

External links

 
 
 
 
 Profile at Galatasaray.org

1985 births
Living people
People from İskenderun
Turkish footballers
Turkey international footballers
Turkey B international footballers
Turkey under-21 international footballers
Turkey youth international footballers
Süper Lig players
Dardanelspor footballers
Manisaspor footballers
Trabzonspor footballers
Galatasaray S.K. footballers
Association football midfielders
Süper Lig managers
Kasımpaşa S.K. managers
Turkish Arab people
UEFA Euro 2016 players
Galatasaray S.K. (football) non-playing staff
Sportspeople from Hatay